Tulosesus is a genus of fungi in the family Psathyrellaceae.

Taxonomy 
The Tulosesus genus was created in 2020 by the German mycologists Dieter Wächter & Andreas Melzer when the Psathyrellaceae family was subdivided based on phylogenetic analysis. Many members of the Coprinellus genus were reclassified as Tulosesus. The type species, Tulosesus callinus was previously classified as Coprinellus callinus.

Etymology 
This genus name is an anagram of setulosus, Latin for having coarse hair or bristles.

Species 
, Index Fungorum accepted 39 species of Tulosesus.

See also 

 Coprinellus

References 

Agaricales genera
Tulosesus
Psathyrellaceae